Magandang Hatinggabi is a 1998 Filipino comedy horror anthology film directed by Laurenti Dyogi, and released by Star Cinema. The film is divided into three episodes, each consisting of a different set of stories, characters, and settings. The episodes are presented as urban legends as told by the Fatman (Noni Buencamino) to a group of young people.

Episodes

Killer Van
The episode is about a family who unknowingly bought a haunted van.

Kuba
This episode is about a woman with a hunched back that harbors a dark secret.

Fatman

Cast and characters

Killer Van
Noni Buencamino as Killer
Eula Valdez as Carla
Allan Paule as Rene
Angelica Panganiban as Myla
Alwyn Uytingco as Carlo/Paolo
Lorena Garcia as Ghost
Fatima Vargas as Lily's Mom
Andy Bais as Car dealer

Kuba
Angelika Dela Cruz as Marianne
Jericho Rosales as Darwin
Jaclyn Jose as Gloria
Boom Labrusca as Darwin's Friend
Lui Villaruz as Darwin's Friend
CJ Tolentino as Darwin's Friend
Monina Bagatsing as Dahlia
Corrine Mendez as Tracy
Mary Kaye De Leon aa Zeny
Wilson Santiago as Gloria's Husband
Paz Bautista as Gloria's Double
Gilberto Lariba as Master Aswang
Rigor Ferrer as Master Aswang
Eva Atienza as Marianne's Double
Pelocronio Campos as Master Kapre

Fatman
Noni Buencamino as Fatman
Marvin Agustin as Frankie
Diether Ocampo as Louie
Mylene Dizon as Abby
Bojo Molina as Richie
Laura James as Kaye
Jay Delos Reyes as Slimy Creature
Kay Flores as Slimy Creature
Andre Velasco as Greenman

References

External links
 

Star Cinema films
1990s Tagalog-language films
Philippine comedy horror films
Philippine ghost films
1990s comedy horror films
1998 comedy films
1998 films